Sursock Palace (French: Palais Sursock), is a grand residence located on Rue Sursock in the city of Beirut in Lebanon.  The palace, which was completed in 1860 by Moïse Sursock, was owned by Lady Cochrane Sursock, an advocate of preserving historic buildings in Lebanon.

The palace, a symbol of the Sursock family's rich history, is located on the historic Sursock Street, in the Rmeil district of Beirut. Sursock House is surrounded by gardens that can be hired for special events, such as weddings. The palace faces the Sursock Museum, a villa from 1912 that was bequeathed to the city of Beirut by Nicolas Sursock and became a museum in 1961. After the Lebanese Civil War, it took 20 years of careful restoration to restore the palace before it reopened in 2010. 

It was damaged during the 2020 Beirut explosions, but there are plans to rebuild the palace.

References

Sursock House
Sursock House (Lebanon)
Houses completed in 1860
19th-century establishments in Ottoman Syria
Sursock family
Palaces in Lebanon
2020 Beirut explosion

External links 
Images of the Sursock house and museum following the August 2020 Beirut explosion., from The Guardian newspaper.